Rice Alexander Pierce (July 3, 1848 – July 12, 1936) was an American politician and a member of the United States House of Representatives for the 9th congressional district of Tennessee.

Biography
Pierce was born on July 3, 1848 in Dresden, Tennessee in Weakley County. He attended the common schools in Tennessee, and during the Civil War he served in the Confederate States Army with the Eighth Tennessee Cavalry. After the war, he attended school in London, Ontario, Canada and studied law in Halifax, North Carolina. He was admitted to the bar of the supreme court in Raleigh, North Carolina in 1868.

Career
In 1869, Pierce commenced practice in Union City, Tennessee in Obion County. He served as mayor in 1872. He was elected the district attorney general of the twelfth judicial circuit in 1874. He was re-elected in 1878 and served until 1883.

Elected as a Democrat to the Forty-eighth Congress, Pierce served from March 4, 1883 to March 3, 1885. He was an unsuccessful candidate for renomination in 1884, but was elected to the Fifty-first and Fifty-second Congresses, and served from March 4, 1889 to March 3, 1893. Again unsuccessful in 1892 to the Fifty-third Congress, he was elected to the Fifty-fifth and to the three succeeding Congresses. He served from March 4, 1897 to March 3, 1905.

When Pierce was an unsuccessful candidate for re-election to the Fifty-ninth Congress in 1904, he resumed the practice of law in Union City, Tennessee. He was chairman of the state Democratic State campaign committee in 1929.

Death
Pierce died in Union City, Tennessee on July 12, 1936 (age 88 years, 9 days). He was interred in the City Cemetery.

References

External links

1848 births
1936 deaths
Democratic Party members of the United States House of Representatives from Tennessee
People from Dresden, Tennessee
People from Union City, Tennessee